Dijana Kvesić (born 11 January 1977) is a Bosnian swimmer. She competed in the women's 200 metre backstroke event at the 1996 Summer Olympics.

References

External links
 

1977 births
Living people
Bosnia and Herzegovina female swimmers
Olympic swimmers of Bosnia and Herzegovina
Swimmers at the 1996 Summer Olympics
Sportspeople from Sarajevo